Cantharidin is an odorless, colorless fatty substance of the terpenoid class, which is secreted by many species of blister beetles. It is a burn agent or a poison in large doses, but preparations containing it were historically used as aphrodisiacs (Spanish fly). In its natural form, cantharidin is secreted by the male blister beetle, and given to the female as a copulatory gift during mating. Afterwards, the female beetle covers her eggs with it as a defense against predators.

Poisoning from cantharidin is a significant veterinary concern, especially in horses, but it can also be poisonous to humans if taken internally (where the source is usually experimental self-exposure). Externally, cantharidin is a potent vesicant (blistering agent), exposure to which can cause severe chemical burns. Properly dosed and applied, the same properties have also been used therapeutically, for instance, for treatment of skin conditions, such as molluscum contagiosum infection of the skin.

Cantharidin is classified as an extremely hazardous substance in the United States, and is subject to strict reporting requirements by facilities that produce, store, or use it in significant quantities.

Chemistry

Structure and nomenclature
Cantharidin, from the Greek kantharis, for beetle, is an odorless, colorless natural product with solubility in various organic solvents, but only slight solubility in water. Its skeleton is tricyclic, formally, a tricyclo-[5.2.1.02,6]decane skeleton. Its functionalities include a carboxylic acid anhydride (−CO−O−CO−) substructure in one of its rings, as well as a bridging ether in its bicyclic ring system.

The complete mechanism of the biosynthesis of cantharidin is unknown. Its framework formally consists of two isoprene units. However, feeding studies indicate that the biosynthetic process is more complicated, and not a simple product of geranyl pyrophosphate or related ten-carbon parent structure, as the seeming monoterpene nature would suggest. Instead, there is a farnesol (15-carbon) precursor from which certain carbon segments are later excised.

Distribution and availability
The level of cantharidin in blister beetles can be quite variable. Among blister beetles of the genus Epicauta in Colorado, E. pennsylvanica contains about 0.2 mg, E. maculata contains 0.7 mg, and E. immaculata contains 4.8 mg per beetle; males also contain higher levels than females.

Males of Berberomeloe majalis have higher level of cantharidin per beetle: 64.22 ± 51.28 mg/g (dry weight) and 9.10 ± 12.64 mg/g (d. w.). Cantharidin content in haemolymph is also higher in males (80.9 ± 106.5 µg/g) than in females (20.0 ± 41.5 µg/g).

History

Aphrodisiac preparations
Preparations made from blistering beetles have been used since ancient times as an aphrodisiac, possibly because their physical effects were perceived to mimic those of sexual arousal, and because they can cause prolonged erection or priapism in men. These preparations were known as cantharides, from the Greek word for “beetle.”

Examples of such use found in historical sources include:

 The ancient Roman historian Tacitus relates that a cantharid preparation was used by the empress Livia, wife of Augustus Caesar, to entice members of the imperial family or dinner guests to commit sexual indiscretions (thus, providing her information to hold over them).
 The German emperor Henry IV (1050–1106) is said to have consumed cantharides.
 The French surgeon Ambroise Paré (1510–1590) described a case in 1572 of a man suffering from “the most frightful satyriasis” after taking a potion composed of nettles and a cantharid extract. This is perhaps the same man of whom Paré relates that a courtesan sprinkled a cantharid powder on food she served to him, after which the man experienced "violent priapism" and anal bleeding, of which he later died. Paré also cites the case of a priest who died of hematuria after swallowing a dose of cantharides, which he intended to fortify his sex drive.
 Cantharides were in widespread use among the upper classes in France in the 1600s, despite being a banned substance. Police searches in connection with a rash of poisonings around 1680 turned up many stashes of “bluish flies,” which were known to be used in the preparation of aphrodisiac potions.
 The French sorceress Catherine Monvoisin (known as “La Voisin,” c. 1640–1680) was recorded in the 1670s as having prepared a love charm made from Spanish fly mixed with dried mole's blood and bat's blood.
 Aphrodisiac sweets presumably laced with cantharides were circulated within libertine circles during the 1700s in France. They were multicolored tablets nicknamed “pastilles de Richelieu,” after the Maréchal de Richelieu, a notorious libertine (not to be confused with his great-uncle, the Cardinal Richelieu) who procured sexual encounters for King Louis XV.
 The French writer Donatien Alphonse François ⁠— ⁠notoriously known as the Marquis de Sade (1740–1814) ⁠— ⁠is said to have given aniseed-flavored pastilles laced with Spanish fly to two prostitutes at a pair of orgies in 1772, poisoning and nearly killing them. He was sentenced to death for that (and for the crime of sodomy), but was later reprieved on appeal.

Non-aphrodisiac uses
 The Spanish clergyman Juan de Horozco y Covarrubias (es) (c. 1540–1610) reported the use of blister beetles as a poison as well as an aphrodisiac.
 Preparations of dried blister beetles were at one time used as a treatment for smallpox. As late as 1892, Andrew Taylor Still, the founder of osteopathy, recommended inhaling a tincture of cantharidin as an effective preventative and treatment for smallpox, decrying vaccination.

Pharmaco-chemical isolation
Cantharidin was first isolated as a chemically pure substance in 1810 by Pierre Robiquet, a French chemist then living in Paris. Robiquet isolated cantharidin as the active ingredient in pharmacological preparations of Lytta vesicatoria, a.k.a. “Spanish fly,” a species of blister beetle. This was one of the first historical instances of the identification and extraction of a simple active principle from a complex medicine.

Robiquet found cantharidin to be an odorless and colorless solid at room temperature. He demonstrated that it was the active principle responsible for the aggressively blistering properties of the coating of the eggs of the blister beetle, and additionally established that cantharidin had toxic properties comparable in degree to those of the most virulent poisons known in the 19th century, such as strychnine.

Other uses of the pharmacological isolate
 Diluted solutions of cantharidin can be used as a topical medication to remove warts and tattoos, and to treat the small papules of molluscum contagiosum.
 In Santería rituals, cantharides are used in incense.

Veterinary issues
Poisoning by Epicauta species from cantharidin is a significant veterinary concern, especially in horses; species infesting feedstocks depend on region—e.g., Epicauta pennsylvanica (black blisterbeetle) in the U.S. midwest; and E. occidentalis, temexia, and vittata species (striped blister beetles) in the U.S. southwest—where the concentrations of the agent in each can vary substantially. Beetles feed on weeds, and occasionally move into crop fields used to produce livestock feeds (e.g., alfalfa), where they are found to cluster and find their way into baled hay, e.g., a single flake (4–5 in. section) may have several hundred insects, or none at all. Horses may be accidentally poisoned when fed bales of fodder with blister beetles in them.

Great bustards, a strongly polygynous bird species, are not immune to the toxicity of cantharidin; they become intoxicated after ingesting blister beetles. However, cantharidin has activity also against parasites that infect them. Great bustards may eat toxic blister beetles of the genus Meloe to increase the sexual arousal of males.

Human medical issues

General risks
As a blister agent, cantharidin has the potential to cause adverse effects when used medically; for this reason, it has been included in a list of “problem drugs” used by dermatologists and emergency personnel.
Despite being widely used, cantharidin has never been and is not currently FDA approved. It is currently in Phase 3 clinical trials for the treatment of molluscum. However, when compounded properly and applied in the clinic topically by a medical provider familiar with its effects and uses, cantharidin can be safely and effectively used to treat some benign skin lesions, like warts and molluscum.

Ingesting cantharidin can initially cause severe damage to the lining of the gastrointestinal and urinary tracts, and may also cause permanent renal damage. Symptoms of cantharidin poisoning include blood in the urine, abdominal pain, and rarely prolonged erections.

Risks of aphrodisiac use

The extreme toxicity of cantharidin makes any use as an aphrodisiac highly dangerous.  As a result, it is illegal to sell (or use) cantharidin or preparations containing it without a prescription in many countries.

Research

Mechanism of action

Topical cantharidin is absorbed by the lipid membranes of epidermal cells, causing the release of serine proteases, enzymes that break the peptide bonds in proteins. This causes the disintegration of desmosomal plaques, cellular structures involved in cell-to-cell adhesion, leading to detachment of the tonofilaments that hold cells together. The process leads to the loss of cellular connections (acantholysis), and ultimately results in blistering of the skin. Lesions heal without scarring.

Pharmaceutical use
VP-102, an experimental drug-device combination that includes cantharidin delivered via a single-use applicator, is being studied for the treatment of molluscum contagiosum, common warts, and genital warts.

Bioactivities
Cantharidin appears to have some effect in the topical treatment of cutaneous leishmaniasis in animal models. In addition to topical medical applications, cantharidin and its analogues may have activity against cancer cells.
Laboratory studies with cultured tumor cells suggest that this activity may be the result of PP2A inhibition.

References 
Explanatory notes

Sources

Further reading
 Dupuis, Gérard & Berland, Nicole (2004). "Cantharidin: Origin and synthesis," Lille, FR: Lycée Faidherbe, see , accessed 13 December 2015.

External links 
 Cantharidin
 Molecule of the Month
 Cantharidin Revisited: Blistering Defense of an Ancient Medicine

Terpenes and terpenoids
Phosphatase inhibitors
Carboxylic anhydrides
Ethers
Blister agents
Abortifacients
Insects in culture